BRP Jose Rizal (FF-150) is the lead ship of her class of guided missile frigates of the Philippine Navy. She is the first purpose-built frigate of the service, as its major warships were mostly obtained from retired patrol ships of other countries. She is also one of the navy's primary warships able to conduct multi-role operations, such as coastal patrol and anti-submarine warfare.

History

The BRP Jose Rizal participated in RIMPAC 2020. In December 2021, she was dispatched to Palawan to provide humanitarian assistance to communities affected by Typhoon Odette.

On 16 October 2022, Jose Rizal became the first Philippine Navy ship to conduct a Replenishment at Sea when she received 30,000 liters of fuel from HMAS Stalwart of the Royal Australian Navy.

Construction and design

The BRP Jose Rizal was designed and built by Hyundai Heavy Industries (HHI) of South Korea and is a derivative of the Incheon-class frigates of the Republic of Korea Navy. Changes were made on the base design by making use of features found on newer frigates of the R.O.K. Navy, considering reduced radar cross-section by having cleaner lines, smooth surface design, reduced overhangs and a low free-board.

On May 1, 2018, the steel cutting ceremony was held for P159 (project number of first of two frigates) at HHI's shipyard in Ulsan, South Korea, marking the first step of the vessel's construction journey.

On October 16, 2018, HHI held the keel laying ceremony for P159, marking the formal start of the construction of the ship.

On December 20, 2018, Secretary of National Defense Delfin Lorenzana announced the names of the two future frigates being built by HHI: BRP Jose Rizal and BRP Antonio Luna.

On May 23, 2019, HHI launched the first vessel, the prospective BRP Jose Rizal. In a press briefing the same day, a Hanwha official said that Link 16 would likely not be compatible for the frigates until 2020 because of issues between US and South Korea. 

From November 2019 to February 2020, HHI held six sea trials that tested:
 the vessel's general seaworthiness and propulsion and associated systems, including its radars,
 the communications and navigational equipment,
 firing of its Super Rapid 76mm main gun,
 weapons and sensors, vessel performance, and integrated platform management system.

The entire team of the Technical Inspection and Acceptance Committee witnessed the sea acceptance tests for the ship in South Korea, and reported that it had “generally satisfactory” results.

On May 23, 2020, the ship arrived in Subic Bay, Zambales after a five-day journey from Ulsan, South Korea. The commissioning was delayed after one of the ship's 65-crew tested positive for COVID-19 amidst the pandemic. On July 10, 2020, the ship was eventually commissioned into service, making the name BRP Jose Rizal (FF-150) official.

See also

References

External links

Jose Rizal-class frigates
2019 ships
Naval ships involved in the COVID-19 pandemic
Ships built by Hyundai Heavy Industries Group